The Harrow Painter was an ancient Greek painter of archaic red-figure pottery. The painter was named by John Beazley after an oinochoe in the Old Speech Room Gallery collection of Harrow School. The oinochoe shows a picture of a handsome boy holding a hoop. Thirty-nine vases have been attributed to the Harrow Painter.

References

Sources
The Perseus Project - The Harrow Painter

External links
Neck of a terracotta oinochoe attr. Harrow Painter at the Metropolitan Museum of Art

1st-millennium BC births
1st-millennium BC deaths
Ancient Greek vase painters
Anonymous artists of antiquity